George Daniels, CBE, FBHI, FSA, AHCI (19 August 1926 – 21 October 2011) was an English horologist who was considered by some to be one of the best in the world in the field of luxury mechanical watches and timepieces during his lifetime. He was a watchmaker who built complete watches by hand (including the case and dial). But it was his creation of the coaxial escapement for which he is most remembered. The movement, which theoretically removed the need to add a lubricant, has been used by Omega in most of their collections since 1999 with the exception of the Speedmaster Moonwatch (until the release of the Speedmaster Moonwatch Caliber 3861 in 2021).

A gold chronograph pocket watch made by George Daniels, the Space Traveller's Watch I, ranks as one of the 20 most expensive watches ever sold at auction, fetching £ 3,615,000 in London on 2 July 2019.

Early career
Daniels was born in Sunderland in 1926. His mother was unmarried so she fled London and travelled north. After Daniels was born he and his mother returned to London, where she married Daniels' father. In 1944, Daniels entered the British Army; he already had an interest in watches and did some repairs for army friends. On leaving the army in 1947 with a gratuity of £50, he bought some tools and got a job as a watch repairer. From studying horology at night classes, he became a Fellow of the British Horological Institute. After a decade of hard work, Daniels opened his first watch repair and cleaning shop in 1960 in London. Becoming interested in the works of the notable early 19th-century French watchmaker Abraham-Louis Breguet, Daniels soon became the 1960s' leading expert on Breguet and was often involved in advising on his work.

Rise to prominence
His friend named Sam Clutton introduced Daniels to the upscale timepiece market and convinced him that he had a future in expensive handcrafted watches. In 1969, Daniels constructed, for £2,000, his first pocket watch for Clutton. When his friend showed the piece to fellow collectors, it created great interest. Five years later, Daniels bought the watch back for £8,000. In 2012, it sold at auction in the United States for $285,000.

Throughout his career, Daniels made signature timepieces for personally selected customers, stating "I never made watches for people if I didn't care for them." The watches, which cost tens of thousands of pounds, took more than 2,500 hours to make. His signature was to give them clear and clean dials with subsidiary dials interwoven with the main chapter ring.

Coaxial escapement

During the quartz crisis, George Daniels accepted a commission from American industrialist and watch collector Seth G. Atwood to create a timepiece that would fundamentally improve the performance of mechanical watches. After much experimentation, Daniels had designed a new type of watch escapement by 1974. The mechanism, which was first unveiled in 1976 as the Atwood watch and patented in 1980, was called the coaxial escapement.

Its design avoided the need to add oil to the escapement because the mechanism operated with very low friction. Traditional escapements had to use lubricants but this eventually caused problems with accuracy as oil thickened over time. However, the coaxial escapement used radial friction instead of sliding friction, making lubricants theoretically unnecessary. In practice a small amount of lubrication is used on the impulse and locking surfaces of the pallet stones. Daniels' mechanism has since been described by some as the most important development in horology in the past 250 years.

Although the horological industry was first introduced to the concept in 1976, Daniels' escapement was met with scepticism and lack of interest. It was not until the 1980s that Swatch Group chairman Nicolas Hayek adopted the concept, using it in his upmarket Omega brand. The company unveiled, to great acclaim, its first automatic watch using Daniels' coaxial escapement at the 1999 Basel Watch and Jewellery Fair.

Later life

Daniels, who was a member of the Swiss Académie Horlogère des Créateurs Indépendants''', continued to make watches well into later life. In total he created 37 handmade watches completely by himself and a 50-piece wristwatch series in conjunction with independent watchmaker, Roger W. Smith, using a basic Omega movement. By the time of his death he is said to have "completed 24 of the most extraordinary and technically advanced watches ever made". His mechanical watches were more accurate than quartz watches, with some losing less than a second per month.

Daniels, who was a Master of the Clockmakers' Company of London, was given their Gold Medal, a rare honour. He also received the Gold Medal of the British Horological Institute, the Gold Medal of the City of London and the Kullberg Medal from the Stockholm Watchmakers' Guild.

In 2006, to celebrate his work and his 80th birthday, Sotheby's and Bobinet (the antique watch dealer) held a retrospective exhibition of his work, featuring every watch Daniels had made, except one which is held by the British Museum. He was given an honorary doctorate by City University London in 2007.

In 2010 Daniels, who was already an MBE, was appointed Commander of the Order of the British Empire (CBE) in the 2010 New Year Honours.Isle of Man watchmaker Dr George Daniels is awarded CBE BBC. 3 February 2010. Retrieve 26 March 2015

Personal life

He married, in 1964, Juliet Marryat, with whom he had a daughter. The marriage was later dissolved. He is the uncle of philosopher Stephen Neale. Daniels died on 21 October 2011.

Daniels was a collector of classic cars. His collection included:
1908 Itala 100 hp Grand Prix Car: won the 1908 French Grand Prix and 1910 Brooklands All-comers Plate (fastest lap at 101.8 mph)
1954 Bentley R-Type Continental Fastback by H.J. Mulliner: ex-Frank Taylor of Taylor Woodrow Construction
1929 4½-litre Bentley Tourer by Vanden Plas: ex-Maharaja of Bhavnagar
1907 Daimler 45 hp Roi-de-Belges Tourer: built for the Earl of Craven
1929–32 Bentley 4½-Litre Supercharged Single-Seater: known as Bentley Blower No.1, developed and driven by Birkin, it set the Brooklands Outer Circuit Lap Record at more than 137 mph in 1931
1932 Alfa Romeo 8C 2300 : Formerly Birkin Le Mans Works car and owned by Italo Balbo

LegacyWatchmaking, written by Daniels and first published in 1981, remains one of the most definitive books on horology. It was the first of another six books, some of which have been translated and published in French, Italian and German, that remain in print. Watchmaking, now in its third edition, was revised and reprinted in 1999.

On 6 November 2012 part of Daniels' collection, including some pieces he made, was sold by Sotheby's in a 134-lot sale. The auction raised over £8 million for the George Daniels Educational Trust, which helps students seeking higher education in the fields of horology, engineering, medicine, building or construction. The most expensive item was his "Space Traveller's Watch" which was sold for £1,329,250 in 2012 and then for £3,196,250 when it was resold in 2017.

Published worksWatches, Clutton, Cecil and George Daniels, B. T. Batsford, Ltd., London, 1965English and American Watches, George Daniels, 1966The Art of Breguet, George Daniels, Sotheby Parke Bernet, London, 1974 Clocks & Watches in the Collection of the Worshipful Company of Clockmakers, Clutton, Cecil and George Daniels, Sotheby Parke Bernet, London, 1975 Watchmaking, George Daniels, Sotheby's, London, 1981  (2011 edition ) The Practical Watch Escapement, George Daniels, Isle of Man, Philip Wilson Publishers Ltd, 2010. All in Good Time: Reflections of a Watchmaker'', George Daniels  Isle of Man (UK), 2000

See also
 List of watch manufacturers

References

External links
 
George Daniels tells his life story at Web of Stories

http://www.omegawatches.com/index.php?id=332.php?id=332Short biography and photograph 
BBC obituary
George Daniels Biography by Michael Weare

English watchmakers (people)
English inventors
English non-fiction writers
Commanders of the Order of the British Empire
Fellows of the Society of Antiquaries of London
1926 births
2011 deaths
English male non-fiction writers
British Army personnel of World War II